Manaswin Nuntasane (formerly: Sirisak Nuntasane; ศิริศักดิ์ นันทเสน) or commonly known by the stage name Tik Shiro (ติ๊ก ชิโร่) is a Thai singer songwriter musician producer and actor, especially popular in the 1990s.

He was born in Nakhon Ratchasima Province, Isan region (northeastern Thailand). He entered the entertainment industry as a drummer for Ploy (พลอย), a popular pop band in the late 80s under Nititad Promotion. In the early 1990s, he had the opportunity to release a solo album in pop dance genre, it has a reputation for him until it is widely known. In the Thai music industry at the time, there were three famous pop dance male singers viz. Touch Na Takuatung from RS Promotion, "J Jetrin" Wattanasin from Grammy Entertainment, and Tik Shiro from Nititad Promotion.

For Tik, he writes lyrics, vocals, and choreography all by himself. Especially his second solo album, Tem Niew (เต็มเหนี่ยว) in 1992 it has sold over a million copies.

In addition, he is also an actor in many TV series and movies, as well as TV host, and singing to the activities of the government on many other occasions, such as the opening ceremony of the 24th SEA Games in Nakhon Ratchasima in 2007 etc.

He is married to Phantira "Aor" Nuntasane, the couple has two daughters.

References

1961 births
Living people
Tik Shiro
Tik Shiro
Tik Shiro
Tik Shiro
Tik Shiro
Tik Shiro
Tik Shiro